Andrew Edward Faulkner (1913-1950) was an American politician and businessman who served as a member of the Massachusetts House of Representatives from 1947 until his death in 1950.

Early life
Faulkner was born on September 23, 1913 in Salem, Massachusetts. He attended grammar and high school in Beverly, Massachusetts. He served in the United States Navy Reserves and became a seaman 1st class. After serving in the Navy, Faulkner ran a filling station until 1948, when he started a fuel oil business.

Political career
Faulkner served three years on the Beverly Board of Aldermen before serving terms in the Massachusetts House of Representatives.

Death
On November 15, 1950, Faulkner used an alias to check into a low-rate rooming house in Scollay Square. He was given a room on the third floor and a few minutes later was observed opening the window, crawling out onto the fire escape and walking to the end of it. He then appeared to jump five feet across and ten feet below to another fire escape of an adjacent building. Faulkner held onto the fire escape for a moment before falling 35 feet to his death. The Medical Examiner ruled Faulkner's death as accidental, based on cuts and bruises on Faulkner's hands that showed he had tried to save himself. Police ruled out the theory of robbery (Faulkner was said to have collected $1,000 prior to his death, however police stated they were confident that the $279 found in his pockets was all the money he had in his position) and investigators instead believed that he had been feeling ill and had gone out on the fire escape to get some air before accidentally falling off.

See also
 1947–1948 Massachusetts legislature
 1949–1950 Massachusetts legislature

References

1913 births
1950 deaths
Deaths from falls
United States Navy sailors
Republican Party members of the Massachusetts House of Representatives
People from Beverly, Massachusetts
20th-century American politicians
United States Navy reservists